Demonstration and Science Experiments (DSX) was a small spacecraft developed by the U.S. Air Force Research Laboratory's Space Vehicles Directorate to perform experiments to study the radiation environment in medium Earth orbit.

Spacecraft 
The Air Force Research Laboratory (AFRL) is responsible for the development and execution of the DSX (originally Deployable Structures Experiment), now Demonstration & Science Experiments, also known as Space Science Technology Experiment (SSTE-4), a suite of four science payloads integrated onto a Evolved Expendable Launch Vehicle (EELV) EELV Secondary Payload Adapter (ESPA) ring based three axis stabilized satellite bus nominally slated for launch into a 6000 × 12000 km, 30° inclination, Medium Earth Orbit (MEO) in the 2019 timeframe with one year required and three year desired operational capability.

Unlike the traditional ESPA approach, in DSX the experiments and host spacecraft stay attached and do not deploy. After the primary satellite in the EELV is deployed, the DSX ESPA separates from the EELV 2nd stage booster to become a free-flyer spacecraft. To address the space access aspect of the rapid-response problem, DSX will utilize an EELV Secondary Payload Adapter (ESPA) capability as a platform for highly-capable small and medium free-flying satellites (or ESPASats) that have plentiful and relatively inexpensive launch opportunities on EELV as secondary payloads.

One deployable boom measured 80 meters and a second measured 16 meters, making DSX one of the largest deployable structures built to operate on orbit.

Payload 
DSX conducted four experiments:
 Wave Particle Interaction Experiment (WPIx)
 Space Weather Experiment (PWx)
 Space Environmental Effects Experiment (SFx)
 Adaptive Controls Experiment (ACE)

Mission 
AFRL kept the satellite in operation for nearly two years, rather than the one year planned, using it to conduct more than 1,300 experiments.

The DSX mission was successfully completed on 31 May 2021. The spacecraft was passivated rather than deorbited due to its high orbit.

References 

Spacecraft launched in 2019
SpaceX military payloads
Air Force Research Laboratory projects
Satellites of the United States